The 1974 Denver Broncos season was the team's 15th year in professional football and its fifth with the National Football League (NFL).  Led by third-year head coach and general manager John Ralston, the Broncos had a winning record for the second straight season with seven wins, six losses, and one tie, which was fifth-best in the conference.

Denver finished second in the AFC West, but 4½ games behind the Oakland Raiders, who clinched in mid-November, and 1½ games behind the wild card Buffalo Bills. In their fifteen years of existence, the Broncos had yet to reach the postseason.

The team played at Detroit on Thanksgiving and won in the final NFL game at Tiger Stadium; the Lions moved north to the Pontiac Silverdome in 1975.

Offseason

NFL Draft

Personnel

Staff

Roster

Regular season

Schedule
 Thursday (November 28: Thanksgiving)

Standings

References

External links
Denver Broncos – 1974 media guide
 Broncos at Pro-Football-Reference.com

Denver Broncos
Denver Broncos seasons
1974 in sports in Colorado